Colonel A. F. C. Vincent CMG was the 3rd Commander of the Ceylon Volunteers Force. He was appointed on 13 May 1896 and held the post till 1902 and again from 1902 to 14 March 1913 and 13 May 1913 to 31 May 1913. Two others, H. G. Morris and Gorden Fraser, acted in between his tenure. He was succeeded by R. B. Fell, as Commander of the Ceylon Defence Force.

References

Commanders of the Ceylon Defence Force
Cameronians officers
Companions of the Order of St Michael and St George